This page details statistics of the Asian Club Championship and AFC Champions League.

General performances

Asian Club Championship and AFC Champions League

Titles by club

A total of 24 clubs have won the tournament since its 1967 inception, with Al-Hilal being the only team to win it four times. Clubs from ten countries have provided tournament winners. South Korean clubs have been the most successful, winning a total of twelve titles.

Titles by nation

Titles by city

AFC Champions League era

Titles by club

Titles by nation

Titles by city

Statistics

All-time top 25 AFC Champions League rankings 
This table includes results beyond group stage of the AFC Champions League through 2002/03 season, therefore:
It does not include the old Asian Club Championship
It does not include qualifying rounds

All-time table by leagues 
 Australian clubs in the AFC Champions League
 Chinese clubs in the AFC Champions League
 Indian football clubs in Asian competitions
 Indonesian football clubs in Asian competitions
 Iranian football clubs in the AFC Champions League
 Iraqi clubs in the AFC Champions League
 Japanese clubs in the AFC Champions League
 Myanmar clubs in the AFC Champions League
 Qatari clubs in the AFC Champions League
 Saudi Arabian clubs in the AFC Champions League
 South Korean clubs in the AFC Champions League
 Thai clubs in the AFC Champions League
 Vietnamese clubs in the AFC Champions League

This table includes results beyond group stage of the AFC Champions League through 2002/03 season (2002–03 AFC Champions League); qualifying rounds are not included.

Number of participating clubs of the Champions League era (from 2002–present) 
The following table is a list of clubs that have participated in the AFC Champions League (group stage).

Year(s) in Bold : Team advanced to the knockout stage.

Attendance record
The following table lists 20 matches with the most attendances at AFC Champions League (More than 70,000 attendances). Persepolis has the records of the most attendances (11 matches among 20 matches with the most attendances) and five matches with the most attendances.

Clubs

Performance review (from 2002–03)

By semi-final appearances

Asian Club Championship and AFC Champions League
The following table is a list of clubs that have participated in the Asian Club Championship and AFC Champions League. Excluding semifinalists from 1987 to 1989–90 seasons. In these seasons, there were no semi-finals as the finalists qualified via a group stage.

Year(s) in Bold: Team was finalist

AFC Champions League era

Year(s) in Bold: Team was finalist

Unbeaten sides
Fourteen clubs have won the Cup unbeaten, only three teams have done this twice:
 Hapoel Tel Aviv had only 1 win in 1967 
 Maccabi Tel Aviv had 4 wins and 2 draws in 1969 and 5 wins (including 2 walkovers) in 1971 
 Esteghlal had 4 wins in 1970 and 4 wins and 1 draw in 1990–91 
 Daewoo Royals had 4 wins in 1985 
 Furukawa Electric had 5 wins in 1986–87 
 Liaoning had 3 wins and 2 draws in 1989–90 
 Al-Hilal had 3 wins and 1 draw in 1991–92 and 6 wins and 1 draw in 1999–2000
 Thai Farmers Bank had 2 wins and 4 draws in 1993–94
 Ilhwa Chunma had 8 wins and 1 draw in 1995
 Suwon Samsung Bluewings had 5 wins and 2 draws in 2001–02
 Al-Ittihad had 4 wins and 2 draws in 2005
 Urawa Red Diamonds had 5 wins and 7 draws in 2007
 Gamba Osaka had 9 wins and 3 draws in 2008
 Ulsan Hyundai had 10 wins and 2 draws in 2012
 Ulsan Hyundai had 9 wins and 1 draw in 2020

Consecutive participations
 Al-Hilal have the record number of consecutive participations in the AFC Champions League with 12 Times Since 2009 .

Biggest wins
The following teams won a single match with goal difference of 6 or more in the AFC Champions League era:

Biggest two-legged wins
The following teams won two-legged matches with goal difference of 5 or more in the knock-out rounds of AFC Champions League era:

Comebacks 

 2009 Quarterfinal, Pohang Steelers made it to semifinal after losing to Bunyodkor in the 1st round, 5–4 (1–3,4–1(a.e.t.))
 2014 Round of 16, Western Sydney Wanderers made it to quarterfinal after losing to Sanfrecce Hiroshima in the 1st round, 3–3 (1–3,2–0)
2017 Round of 16, Urawa Red Diamonds made it to quarterfinal after losing to Jeju United in the 1st round, 3–2 (0–2,3–0(a.e.t))
2017 Quarterfinal, Urawa Red Diamonds made it to semifinal after being largest 3 goals in total score of two rounds(1–4)  behind Kawasaki Frontale, 5–4 (1–3,4–1).

Countries
In addition to the two finals, 25 meetings between teams from the same country have been played:
10 meetings from the South Korea:
2006 Semifinal, Jeonbuk Hyundai Motors – Ulsan Hyundai Horang-i, 6–4 (2–3, 4–1)
2010 Quarterfinal, Seongnam Ilhwa Chunma – Suwon Samsung Bluewings, 4–3 (4–1, 0–2)
2014 Round of 16, Jeonbuk Hyundai Motors – Pohang Steelers, 1–3 (1–2, 0–1)
2014 Quarterfinal, Pohang Steelers – FC Seoul, 0–0 (0–3 pen.)
2016 Semifinal, Jeonbuk Hyundai Motors – FC Seoul, 5–3 (4–1, 1–2)
2018 Round of 16, Ulsan Hyundai – Suwon Samsung Bluewings, 1–3 (1–0,0–3)
2018 Quarterfinal, Jeonbuk Hyundai Motors – Suwon Samsung Bluewings, 3–3 (0–3, 3–0)
2021 Quarterfinal, Jeonbuk Hyundai Motors – Ulsan Hyundai 2–3 
2021 Semifinal, Ulsan Hyundai – Pohang Steelers, 1–1  
2022 Round of 16, Daegu FC – Jeonbuk Hyundai Motors, 1–2 
8 meetings from the Saudi Arabia:
2009 Round of 16, Al-Ittihad – Al-Shabab, 2–1
2011 Round of 16, Al-Ittihad – Al-Hilal, 3–1
2012 Semifinal, Al-Ittihad – Al-Ahli, 1–2 (1–0, 0–2)
2014 Round of 16, Al-Ittihad – Al-Shabab, 4–1 (1–0, 3–1)
2019 Round of 16, Al-Ahli – Al-Hilal, 3–4 (2–4, 1–0)
2019 Quarterfinal, Al-Ittihad – Al-Hilal, 1–3 (0–0, 1–3)
2020 Round of 16, Al-Nassr – Al-Taawoun, 1–0
2020 Quarterfinal, Al-Nassr – Al-Ahli, 2–0
7 meetings from the Japan:
2008 Semifinal, Gamba Osaka – Urawa Red Diamonds, 4–2 (1–1, 3–1)
2009 Round of 16, Gamba Osaka – Kawasaki Frontale, 2–3
2009 Quarterfinal, Kawasaki Frontale – Nagoya Grampus, 3–4 (2–1, 1–3)
2011 Round of 16, Gamba Osaka – Cerezo Osaka, 0–1
2017 Quarterfinal, Kawasaki Frontale – Urawa Red Diamonds, 4–5 (3–1, 1–4)
2019 Round of 16, Kashima Antlers – Sanfrecce Hiroshima, 3(a)–3 (1–0, 2–3)
2022 Round of 16, Vissel Kobe – Yokohama F. Marinos, 3–2
4 meetings from the Iran:
2010 Round of 16, Zob Ahan – Mes Kerman, 1–0
2012 Qualifying play-off, Esteghlal – Zob Ahan, 2–0
2012 Round of 16, Sepahan – Esteghlal, 2–0
2018 Round of 16, Zob Ahan – Esteghlal, 2–3 (1–0, 1–3)
4 meetings from the China:
2017 Round of 16, Shanghai SIPG – Jiangsu Suning, 5–3 (2–1, 3–2)
2017 Quarterfinal, Shanghai SIPG – Guangzhou Evergrande, 5–5 (4–0, 1–5)
2018 Round of 16, Tianjin Quanjian – Guangzhou Evergrande, 2–2 (0–0, 2–2) 
2019 Round of 16, Guangzhou Evergrande – Shandong Luneng, 4–4 (2–1, 2–3) 
3 meetings from the United Arab Emirates:
2014 Round of 16, Al-Jazira – Al-Ain, 2–4 (1–2, 1–2)
2015 Round of 16, Al-Ahli – Al-Ain, 3–3 (0–0, 3–3)
2021 Round of 16, Sharjah – Al-Wahda, 1–1  
1 meeting from the Qatar:
2015 Round of 16, Al-Sadd – Lekhwiya, 3–4 (1–2, 2–2)
 In 2009, 2011, and 2019, all four Saudi Arabian teams had advancing past the group stage.
 In 2009 and 2011, all four Japanese teams had advancing past the group stage.
 In 2010, 2015 and 2021, all four South Korean teams had advancing past the group stage.
 2010 was the only season that four teams from the same country reached the quarter-final stage, South Korea's Jeonbuk Hyundai Motors, Pohang Steelers, Seongnam Ilhwa Chunma and Suwon Samsung Bluewings.
South Korean teams kept advancing to semifinals from 2009 to 2014.
South Korean teams kept advancing to finals from 2009 to 2013.

Specific group stage records

Meetings 

 Shanghai Shenhua, Suwon Samsung Bluewings, Kashima Antlers and Sydney FC met each other again in 2018 as they met in 2011. Especially the former three are in a group in 2009.

Goalscoring and conceding 

Most goals scored in a group stage: 28
Kashima Antlers (2008)
Fewest goals scored in a group stage: 0
Tokyo Verdy (2006)
Shahr Khodro (2020)
Ratchaburi Mitr Phol (2021)
Guangzhou (2022)
Fewest goals conceded in a group stage: 0
Pakhtakor (2002–03)
Al-Wahda (2004)
Busan IPark (2005)
Ulsan Hyundai (2006)
Most goals conceded in a group stage: 29
Persipura Jayapura (2010)
Highest goal difference in a group stage: +25
Busan IPark (2005)
Kashima Antlers (2008)
Lowest goal difference in a group stage: –26
Da Nang (2006)
Tampines Rovers (2021)

Six wins
Six teams have won all their games in a group stage; these are:

 Shandong Luneng, 2005
 Busan IPark, 2005
 Kashima Antlers, 2010
 Al-Duhail, 2018
 Kawasaki Frontale, 2021
 Ulsan Hyundai, 2021

Four teams have won all their games in a group stage (not 6 games); these are:
 Al-Ain (3 wins), 2002–03
 Pakhtakor (3 wins), 2002–03
 Ulsan Hyundai Horang-i (2 wins), 2006
 Shanghai Shenhua (2 wins), 2006

Six draws
No team

Six losses
Ten teams have lost all their games in a group stage (6 games); these are:

 FC Neftchi Fergana, 2004
 Hoang Anh Gia Lai, 2005
 Da Nang, 2006
 Dong Tam Long An, 2007
 Al-Arabi, 2012
 Al-Wasl, 2018
 Guangzhou has achieved this feat twice, in 2021 and 2022
 Tampines Rovers, 2021
 Kaya–Iloilo, 2021
 United City, 2022

Six teams have lost all their games in a group stage (not 6 games); these are:
 Osotsapa (3 losses), 2002–03
 Nisa Aşgabat (3 losses), 2002–03
 Al-Shorta (4 losses), 2004
 Tokyo Verdy (2 losses), 2006
 Dong Tam Long An (2 losses), 2006
 Shahr Khodro (4 losses), 2020

Advancing past the group stage
 Al-Hilal holds the record for the most consecutive seasons advancing past the group stage with 9 from 2009 to 2017.
 Two title holders did not qualify from the following year's group stage:
 Western Sydney Wanderers in 2015
 Guangzhou Evergrande in 2016
 Al-Wahda and Ulsan Hyundai scored the fewest goals (3) to earn 6 points in the group stage (not 6 games) in 2004 and 2006.
 Pakhtakor and Shabab Al-Ahli also scored the fewest goals (3) to earn 7 points in the group stage (not 6 games) in 2004 and 2020.
 Beijing Guoan scored the fewest goals (4) to earn 9 points in the group stage (6 games) in 2013. Also, Sydney FC scored (4) goals to earn 10 points in the group stage of 2016.

Biggest disparity between group winner and runner-up
The biggest points difference between the first- and second-placed teams in a Champions League group phase is 11 points, achieved by only one team:
 Al-Duhail, 18 points (13:6 goals) (+7) in 2018. (2nd Zob Ahan 7 points, 3rd Lokomotiv Tashkent 7 points, 4th Al-Wahda 3 points).

Most points achieved, yet knocked out
15 points (only one team advanced):
 Yokohama F. Marinos, in (2004).
13 points (only one team advanced):
 Sepahan, in (2004).
 Suwon Samsung Bluewings, in (2005).
 Al-Sadd, in (2006).
 Shandong Luneng, in (2007).
12 points (only one team advanced):
 Júbilo Iwata, in (2004).
 Yokohama F. Marinos, in (2005).
 Dalian Shide, in (2006).
 Changchun Yatai, in (2008).
 Beijing Guoan, in (2008).
 Melbourne City, in (2022).
10 points (only two teams advanced):
 Urawa Red Diamonds, in (2013).
 Buriram United, in (2015).
 Pakhtakor, in (2016).

Fewest points achieved, yet advanced
 three games (one out of four teams advanced):
 7 points:
 BEC Tero Sasana in 2002–03
 Dalian Shide in 2002–03

 four games (two out of three teams advanced):
 5 points:
 Esteghlal in 2020
 Suwon Samsung Bluewings in 2020

 six games (two out of four teams advanced):
 7 points:
 Buriram United in 2013
 Central Coast Mariners in 2013
 Zob Ahan in 2018
 Melbourne Victory in 2020

Players

All-time appearances 

From 2005 season and excluding qualifying games & appearances

Winning the Trophy

Goalscoring

All-time top goalscorers 

From 2003 season and excluding qualifying games & goals

Top scorer awards 
The top scorer award is for the player who amassed the most goals in the tournament, excluding the qualifying rounds.
Muriqui (Guangzhou Evergrande) has the record for most goals in one season with 13 in 2013, along with Adriano (FC Seoul) in 2016 and Baghdad Bounedjah (Al-Sadd) in 2018.
Mohamed Kallon (Al-Ittihad) has the record for fewest goals for a top scorer in one season with 6 in 2005.
Seongnam Ilhwa Chunma, Gamba Osaka, Guangzhou Evergrande and Al-Hilal are the clubs to have received the most awards with 2 each:
Seongnam Ilhwa Chunma 
Kim Do-hoon in 2004
Mota in 2007
Gamba Osaka 
Magno Alves in 2006 
Leandro in 2009
Guangzhou Evergrande
Muriqui in 2013 
Ricardo Goulart in 2015
Al-Hilal
Omar Kharbin in 2017 
Bafétimbi Gomis in 2019
Brazilian players have received the most awards with 8:
Magno Alves in 2006
Mota in 2007
Leandro in 2009
Jose Mota in 2010
Ricardo Oliveira in 2012
Muriqui in 2013
Ricardo Goulart in 2015
Adriano in 2016

Hat-tricks 
The first hat-trick of the AFC Champions League era was scored by Seongnam Ilhwa Chunma's Kim Do-hoon against Osotsapa on 9 March 2003.
Seven players have managed to score two or more hat-tricks in the AFC Champions League:
Kim Do-Hoon (two for Seongnam Ilhwa Chunma)
Nantawat Tansopa (two for Krung Thai Bank)
Leandro (one for Gamba Osaka and one for Al-Sadd)
Araújo (two for Al-Gharafa)
Krunoslav Lovrek (two for Jeonbuk Hyundai Motors)
Ricardo Oliveira (two for Al-Jazira)
Adriano (two for FC Seoul and one for Jeonbuk Hyundai Motors)
Ricardo Goulart (three for Guangzhou Evergrande)

List of hat-tricks

 4 Player scored 4 goals
 5 Player scored 5 goals

Managers

See also 
 Australian clubs in the AFC Champions League
 Chinese clubs in the AFC Champions League
 Indian football clubs in Asian competitions
 Indonesian football clubs in Asian competitions
 Iranian clubs in the AFC Champions League
 Iraqi clubs in the AFC Champions League
 Japanese clubs in the AFC Champions League
 Myanmar clubs in the AFC Champions League
 Qatari clubs in the AFC Champions League
 Saudi Arabian clubs in the AFC Champions League
 South Korean clubs in the AFC Champions League
 Thai clubs in the AFC Champions League
 Vietnamese clubs in the AFC Champions League
 Vietnamese football clubs in the AFC Cup
 Pakistani football clubs in Asian competitions
 Turkish football clubs in European competitions

References

External links
 The-afc.com

Statistics
AFC Champions League records and statistics